"Out of My Mind / Holy Water" is a fund-raising two-track CD single from the supergroup WhoCares, a Tony Iommi and Ian Gillan collaboration, a direct continuation of the Rock Aid Armenia project. The CD contains the single "Out of My Mind" and the song "Holy Water" with the latter using the traditional Armenian instrument, the duduk by two Armenian musicians Arshak Sahakyan and Ara Gevorgyan. Both tracks of the CD were recorded at SARM Studios in Notting Hill, London.

The sale of the CD is to raise money to rebuild a music school in Gyumri, Armenia after the destruction of the city in the 1988 earthquake in Armenia and to buy musical instruments for the school. The CD was released on May 6, 2011, by Ear Music / Edel.

The recordings also appear on the WhoCares 2-CD release Ian Gillan & Tony Iommi: WhoCares on 13 July 2012.

"Out of My Mind"
"Out of My Mind" was co-written by Ian Gillan and Tony Iommi 
Credits
Vocals – Ian Gillan
Guitar – Tony Iommi
Guitar – Mikko "Linde" Lindström 
Bass – Jason Newsted 
Drums –  Nicko McBrain
Keyboards – Jon Lord

Holy Water
"Holy Water", the second song was co-written by Ian Gillan and Steve Morris
Credits
Vocals – Ian Gillan
Guitar – Tony Iommi, Steve Morris and Michael Lee Jackson
Bass – Rodney Appleby
Drums – Randy Clarke
Keyboards – Jesse O'Brien
Duduk – Arshak Sahakyan
Duduk and keyboards – Ara Gevorgyan

Further credits
Artwork – Antje Warnecke
Cover [Concept] – Max Vaccaro 
Engineer, Engineer [Assistant] – Mike Exeter (track 1)
Liner Notes – Ian Gillan, Tony Iommi
Mastered by – Dick Beetham
Mixed by – Mike Exeter, Tony Iommi

Documentary: Picture of Home
The two-track CD release also includes a 30-minute documentary Picture of Home shot by Bernie Zelvis and Christina Rowatt in which Ian Gillan recalls his visits to Armenia after the 1988 earthquake.

The release also contains a video for "Out of My Mind".

Track list
Downloads
"Out of My Mind" (5:18)
"Holy Water" (7:01)

Deluxe CD single
"Out of My Mind" (5:18)
"Holy Water" (7:01)
Video music for "Out of My Mind" 
Video – Documentary Picture of Home (30:00)

7" vinyl single
(Numbered limited edition of 1000 copies only worldwide)
Side A: "Out of My Mind" (5:18)
Side B: "Holy Water" (7:01)

Charts
The single "Out of My Mind" reached No. 86 on the German Singles Chart.

The album Ian Gillan & Tony Iommi: WhoCares had good sales because of the big names appearing on the album. It reached No. 26 in the Swedish Albums Chart and No. 29 on the Norwegian Albums Chart on week 30/2012 dated week ending 27 July 2012.

References

2011 debut singles
WhoCares songs
Charity singles
Ian Gillan
2011 songs